Hyecho (704–787), Sanskrit: Prajñāvikrama; pinyin: Hui Chao, was a Buddhist monk from Silla, one of the Three Kingdoms of Korea.

Hyecho studied esoteric Buddhism in Tang China, initially under Śubhakarasiṃha and then under the famous Indian monk Vajrabodhi who praised Hyecho as "one of six living persons who were well-trained in the five sections of the Buddhist canon."

On the advice of his Indian teachers in China, he set out for India in 723 to acquaint himself with the language and culture of the land of the Buddha.

Memoir of the pilgrimage to the five kingdoms of India

During his journey of India, Hyecho wrote a travelogue in Chinese named "Memoir of the pilgrimage to the five kingdoms of India" (in Korean Wang ocheonchukguk jeon).

The travelogue reveals that Hyecho, after arriving by sea in India headed to the Indian Kingdom of Magadha (present-day Bihar), then moved on to visit Kushinagar and Varanasi. However Hyecho's journey did not end there and he continued north, where he visited Lumbini (present-day Nepal), Kashmir, the Arabs. Hyecho left India following the Silk Road towards the west, via Agni or Karasahr, to China where the account ends in 729 CE.

He referred to three kingdoms lying to the northeast of Kashmir which were "under the suzerainty of the Tibetans…. The country is narrow and small, and the mountains and valleys very rugged. There are monasteries and monks, and the people faithfully venerate the Three Jewels. As to the kingdom of Tibet to the East, there are no monasteries at all and the Buddha's teaching is unknown; but in [these above-mentioned] countries the population consists of Hu, therefore they are believers."

Rizvi goes on to point out that this passage not only confirms that in the early eighth century the region of modern Ladakh was under Tibetan suzerainty, but that the people were of non-Tibetan stock.

It took Hyecho approximately four years to complete his journey. The travelogue contains much information on local diet, languages, climate, cultures, and political situations.

It is mentioned that Hyecho witnessed the decline of Buddhism in India. He also found it quite interesting to see the cattle roaming freely around cities and villages.

The travelogue was lost for many years until a fragment of it was rediscovered by Paul Pelliot in the Mogao Caves in China in 1908 and was subsequently translated into different languages over the years; the original version of Wang ocheonchukguk jeon. The original fragment is now in France.

Excerpt: Hyecho on Jibin
One of the important excerpts from Hyecho's work relates to his visit Jibin (Kapisa) in 726 CE: for example, he reports that the country was ruled by a Turk King, thought to be one of the Turk Shahis, and that his Queen and dignitaries practice Buddhism (三寶, "Triratna"):

See also
Korean Buddhism
Silk Road transmission of Buddhism
Xuanzang
Faxian
Yijing
Song Yun
Wang ocheonchukguk jeon
Great Tang Records on the Western Regions
A Record of Buddhist Practices Sent Home from the Southern Sea

Notes

References
 Sen, Surendranath (1956). India Through Chinese Eyes: Sir William Meyer Endowment Lectures 1952–53. University of Madras.
 Fully digitized "Wang ocheonchukguk jeon" on International Dunhuang Project website
W. Fuchs (ed. and transl.), "Huei-ch'ao's Pilgerreise durch Nordwest-Indien und Zentral-Asien um 726," Sitzungberichten der Preußischen Akademie der Wissenschaften, Phil-hist. Klasse, XXX, (Berlin, 1939): 426-469.

External links
 

704 births
787 deaths
Buddhist monks
Korean Buddhist monks
Korean Buddhists
8th-century Buddhist monks
8th-century Buddhists
Explorers of Asia
Silla Buddhist monks
Vajrayana
Pilgrimage accounts
Explorers of India
Explorers of Nepal
Korean expatriates in India